OLA may stand for:
United Nations Office of Legal Affairs
Official Languages Act 2003, Ireland
Oklahoma Library Association
Online authorisation
Ontario Lacrosse Association
Ontario Library Association
Open Learning Agency, British Columbia, Canada
Operational-level agreement in support of a service-level agreement 
WebSphere Optimized Local Adapters, IBM software 
Oregon Library Association
Oromo Liberation Army, formerly the armed wing of the OLF
Ostseeland Verkehrs Gmbh, a Transdev Germany railway
Our Lady of the Abandoned Parish Church (Marikina), Philippines
Overlap–add method in signal processing
Overland Airways, ICAO airline code OLA
OLA Girls Senior High School (Ho), Ghana
OLA Girls Senior High School (Kenyasi), Ghana